Rhodopina lewisii is a species of beetle in the family Cerambycidae. It was described by Henry Walter Bates in 1873.

Subspecies
 Rhodopina lewisii koshikijimana Komiya, 1984
 Rhodopina lewisii lewisii (Bates, 1873)
 Rhodopina lewisii yakushimana Komiya, 1984

References

lewisii
Beetles described in 1873